Natalie Khor Pei Kee  (born 17 September 1981) is the Miss Hong Kong International Goodwill 2005.

Early life
She is a single child in her family, born to a father from Malaysia and a mother from Hong Kong. Khor was born in London, raised in Hong Kong, completed in high school in the US, and went to university in Australia.

Pageant
In 2005 she competed in the Miss Hong Kong Pageant. At the pageant, she won the title of Miss International Goodwill. She travelled to several countries in Southeast Asia and Chinese to promote the tourism in Hong Kong. In additions, she hosted some shows and performed in charity shows in Hong Kong.

Career
After the pageant, Khor became a qualified accountant and completed a Master's degree. She has worked for the global accounting firm Deloitte Touche Tohmatsu Limited.

Khor is currently a spokesperson for Hong Kong and Shanghai Banking Corporation (HSBC). She has appeared on local financial channel talk shows, providing market commentaries.

References

1984 births
Living people
Hong Kong beauty pageant winners
Malaysian people of Chinese descent
British people of Hong Kong descent
TVB
Hong Kong people of Malaysian descent
Hong Kong accountants
Deloitte people
HSBC people